Acanthognathus brevicornis is a species of ant belonging to the genus Acanthognathus. Described in 1944 by Smith, M.R., the species is native to northwestern South America.

References

Myrmicinae
Hymenoptera of South America
Insects described in 1944